Tetrathemis yerburii is a species of dragonfly in the family Libellulidae. It is endemic to Sri Lanka.  Its natural habitats are subtropical or tropical moist lowland forests and rivers. It is threatened by habitat loss.

References

Dragonflies of Sri Lanka
Libellulidae
Taxonomy articles created by Polbot
Insects described in 1894